Czech Republic competed at the 2022 World Games held in Birmingham, United States from 7 to 17 July 2022. Athletes representing the Czech Republic won three silver medals and three bronze medals. The country finished in 53rd place in the medal table.

Medalists

Competitors
The following is the list of number of competitors in the Games.

Air sports

Czech Republic competed in air sports and drone racing.

Air sports

Drone racing

Archery

Czech Republic competed in archery.

Bowling

Czech Republic won one silver medal in bowling.

Canoe marathon

Czech Republic competed in canoe marathon.

Dancesport

Czech Republic competed in two disciplines of dancesport.

Latin

Rock 'n' roll

Finswimming

Czech Republic competed in finswimming.

Floorball

Czech Republic won bronze medal in the floorball tournament.

Group play

Semifinal

Bronze medal game

Inline hockey

Czech Republic won silver medal in the inline hockey tournament.

Karate 

Czech Republic competed in karate.

Kickboxing

Czech Republic won one bronze medal in kickboxing.

Korfball 

Czech Republic competed in the korfball tournament.

Lacrosse 

Czech Republic competed in the lacrosse women's team tournament.

Muaythai 

Czech Republic competed in muay thai.

Orienteering 

Czech Republic won two medals in orienteering. Czech Republic sent full team of four athletes to compete in orienteering.

Parkour 

Czech Republic competed in parkour.

Squash

Czech Republic competed in squash.

Roller Speed Skating

Road Speed Skating 

One athlete from Czech Republic competed in road speed skating.

Point race

Elimination race

Road Speed Skating 

One athlete from Czech Republic competed in track speed skating.

Point elimination race

1000 m sprint

Elimination race

Water skiing 

Czech Republic competed in water skiing.

Freestyle

Slalom

References 

Nations at the 2022 World Games
2022
World Games